Moramo waterfalls is a cascade waterfall located in Kendari, South Konawe Regency, Southeast Sulawesi, Indonesia.
GPS coordinate 3° 58' 2.96" S 122° 35' 40.92" E.

Landforms of Sulawesi
Waterfalls of Indonesia
Landforms of Southeast Sulawesi